Psara subaurantialis is a moth in the family Crambidae. It was described by Gottlieb August Wilhelm Herrich-Schäffer in 1871. It is found in Cuba.

References

Spilomelinae
Moths described in 1871
Endemic fauna of Cuba